, also known as HAB, is a Japanese broadcast network affiliated with ANN. Their headquarters are located in Ishikawa Prefecture.

History
HAB launched on October 1, 1991, as Ishikawa Prefecture's fourth broadcasting station. On its fifteenth anniversary, October 1, 2006, the station began Digital terrestrial television broadcasts from its primary transmitter at Kanazawa and its Nanao relay.

Transmitters

Local programs
HAB Super J Channel - from 16:50 until 19:00 on Weekdays
Doki Doki TV
Kenkō no Yakata
MID TV - from 25:45 until 26:15 on Thursdays

External links
 Hokuriku Asahi Broadcasting

All-Nippon News Network
Asahi Shimbun Company
Ishikawa Prefecture
Television stations in Japan
Television channels and stations established in 1991
Mass media in Kanazawa, Ishikawa
1991 establishments in Japan